Mehmandust-e Sofla (also Romanized as Mehmāndūst-e Soflá; also known as Mehmāndūst, Mehmāndūst-e Pā’īn, and Mīhmāndūst-e Pā’īn) is a village in Mehmandust Rural District, Kuraim District, Nir County, Ardabil Province, Iran. At the 2006 census, its population was 100, in 22 families.

References 

Towns and villages in Nir County